Jeanne Vercheval-Vervoort (born March 16, 1939) is a Belgian social activist and feminist. She advocates for women's rights, workers' rights, and feminism.

Biography 
Jeanne Vercheval was born in Charleroi on March 16, 1939. She was active within communist and pacifist organizations before committing to the new feminism. She co-founded the Marie Mineur, which supports strikes by women workers demanding better working conditions, campaigns for the decriminalization of abortion and participates with Marie Denis and Suzanne Van Rokeghem in the drafting of the Little Red Book of Women.

Towards the end of the 1970s, she cooperated with the women's magazine Voyelles (1979-1982) which combined informative articles and lighter sections. In 2006, Jeanne Vercheval was the author, with Jacqueline Aubenas and Suzanne Van Rokeghem, of Des Femmes dans l'Histoire, in Belgium since 1830.

References 

Belgian women's rights activists
People from Charleroi
Abortion-rights activists
1939 births
Belgian women activists
Workers' rights activists
Living people